Several Royal Navy ships have been named HMS Diamond.

 , a 50-gun ship launched at Deptford in 1652 and captured by France in 1693.
 , a fifth-rate 50 gun ship launched at Blackwall Yard in 1708 and rebuilt at Deptford Dockyard in 1722, sold in 1744.
 , a fifth-rate launched at Limehouse in 1741 and sold in 1756.
 , a fifth-rate launched at Hull in 1774 and sold in 1784.
 , a fifth-rate launched at Deptford in 1794 and broken up in 1812.
 , a fifth-rate launched at Chatham in 1816 and broken up following a serious fire at Portsmouth in 1827.
 , a sixth-rate frigate launched in 1848. She was used as a training ship and renamed Joseph Straker between 1866 and 1868, and sold in 1885. 
 , a 14-gun  launched in 1874 and sold in 1889.
 , a  built by Cammell Laird, launched in 1904 and scrapped in 1921
 , a D-class destroyer launched in 1931 and lost in action in 1941.
 , a  destroyer launched in 1950 and sold in 1980.
 , a Type 45 destroyer which began construction in 2005 and was launched on 27 November 2007.

Battle honours
Ships named Diamond have earned the following battle honours:

Armada, 1588
Kentish Knock, 1652
Portland, 1653
Gabbard, 1653
Scheveningen, 1653
Lowestoft, 1665
Four Days' Battle, 1666
Orfordness, 1666
Sole Bay, 1672
Schooneveld, 1673
Texel, 1673
Crimea, 1854–55
Spartivento, 1940
Mediterranean, 1941
Malta Convoys, 1941
Greece, 1941

See also
Diamond Rock, a rock off Martinique commissioned as HMS Diamond Rock in 1804 and recaptured by the French in 1805. 
 was a six-gun sloop commissioned in 1804 in Martinique to serve as a tender to Diamond Rock and lost to a French privateer in June of that year.

References

Royal Navy ship names